Elections to Southend-on-Sea Borough Council took place on 6 May 2021. This was on the same day as other local elections across the United Kingdom. The results saw the Conservatives and Labour pick up seats at the expense of the local Independents.

The "rainbow coalition" between Labour, the Liberal Democrats and local independents continued in office, with Labour councillor Ian Gilbert being elected leader of the council.

Composition
Directly after the 2019 election the composition of the council was:

Prior to the election the composition of the council was:

After the election, the composition of the council was:

Result summary

Results

Belfairs

 
 
 
 

 

No UKIP candidate as previous (-11.5).

Blenheim Park

Chalkwell

 
 
 
 

 

No Independent candidate as previous (-12.0).

Eastwood Park

Kursaal

 
 
 

 

No Independent candidate as previous (-14.1).

Leigh

Milton

Prittlewell

Shoeburyness

Southchurch

 
 
 
 

 

No UKIP candidate as previous (-11.1).

St. Laurence

St. Luke's

Thorpe

Victoria

West Leigh

West Shoebury

Westborough

Notes

References

2021
Southend-on-Sea
May 2021 events in the United Kingdom
2020s in Essex